Adam Brooks (born September 3, 1956) is a Canadian film director, screenwriter, and actor. He is best known for writing and directing Definitely, Maybe (2008) and for writing screenplays for French Kiss (1995), Wimbledon (2004), and Bridget Jones: The Edge of Reason (2004). His first film as a writer-director Almost You won the Jury Prize at the Sundance Film Festival in 1985.

Brooks served as a council member of the Writers Guild of America East and is currently on the board of the Writers Guild of America East Foundation. He also teaches film at the Columbia University Graduate School of the Arts. Brooks lives in New York City.

Filmography

Honors and awards
 1985 Sundance Film Festival Special Jury Prize for Almost You
 1998 Golden Satellite Award nomination for Best Motion Picture Screenplay Adaption for Beloved

References

External links
 
 

1956 births
Canadian male screenwriters
Film directors from Toronto
Living people
Writers from Toronto
Sundance Film Festival award winners
20th-century Canadian screenwriters
20th-century Canadian male writers
21st-century Canadian screenwriters
21st-century Canadian male writers